KHST (101.7 FM) is a radio station broadcasting an oldies format. KHST began airing a country music format on March 1, 2011 after having been a classic hits station for several years and an adult contemporary station in the 1990s. Licensed to Lamar, Missouri, United States, the station serves the Joplin area. The station's studios are in Pittsburg, Kansas. KHST is currently owned by Michael D Landis.

On June 2, 2022, KHST changed their format from country as "My Country 101.7" to oldies.

References

External links

HST
Radio stations established in 1992
1992 establishments in Missouri
Oldies radio stations in the United States